The 2003 Islands District Council election was held on 23 November 2003 to elect all 8 elected members to the 20-member District Council.

Overall election results
Before election:

Change in composition:

References

External links
 Election Results - Overall Results

2003 Hong Kong local elections